William or Bill Bridges may refer to:

William Bridges (author) (1933–2013), American writer and organizational consultant
William Bridges (general) (1861–1915), commander of the Australian Army's First Australian Imperial Force in 1914–1915
William Bridges (politician) (died 1714), Member of Parliament for Liskeard and member of the Board of Ordnance
William B. Bridges (born 1934), American professor of engineering
William Bridges (preacher) (1802–1874), Methodist preacher, hat block maker and founder of the Plumstead Peculiar People
William Thomas Bridges (1821–1894), barrister in British Hong Kong
Bill Bridges (American football), American football player
Bill Bridges (basketball) (1939–2015), American basketball player
Bill Bridges (game designer) (born 1965), American RPG developer and author

See also
William Brydges (disambiguation)